The Waterford Steam Electric Station, Unit 3, also known as Waterford 3, is a nuclear power plant located on a  plot in Killona, Louisiana, in St. Charles Parish, about  west of New Orleans.

This plant has one Combustion Engineering two-loop pressurized water reactor. The plant has a maximum dependable capacity of 1,152 megawatts of electricity. The power station's main generator is rated at 1333.2 MVA at a 0.9 power factor (60 psi hydrogen pressure). In 2005, the plant was approved for a 8% (275 MWt) power uprate. The post-uprate  nominal main generator output was rated at 1231 MW. 

The reactor has a dry ambient pressure containment building.

On August 28, 2005, Waterford shut down due to Hurricane Katrina approaching and declared an unusual event (the least-serious of a four-level emergency classification scale).  Shortly after Katrina, Waterford restarted and resumed normal operation.

During the 2011 Mississippi River floods, the plant was shut down briefly after a refueling shutdown on April 6, but was restarted on May 12. 

The plant shut down on October 17, 2012, for steam-generator replacement. The plant returned to full power in the middle of January 2013.

The plant shut down on August 28, 2021 in preparation for Hurricane Ida. On August 29, 2021 the plant declared an “unusual event″ — its lowest level of emergency — after the facility lost offsite electrical power.

Ownership 
Waterford is operated by Entergy Nuclear and is owned by Entergy Louisiana, Inc.

Electricity Production

Surrounding population 

The 2010 U.S. population within  of Waterford was 75,538, an increase of 7.4 percent in a decade, according to an analysis of U.S. Census data for msnbc.com. The 2010 U.S. population within  was 1,969,431, a decrease of 0.8 percent since 2000. Cities within 50 miles include New Orleans (33 miles to city center).

Seismic risk
The Nuclear Regulatory Commission's estimate of the risk each year of an earthquake intense enough to cause core damage to the reactor at Waterford was 1 in 50,000, according to an NRC study published in August 2010.

See also

 River Bend Nuclear Generating Station, in West Feliciana Parish, Louisiana

Notes

External links

NRC's web page on Waterford

Energy infrastructure completed in 1985
Buildings and structures in St. Charles Parish, Louisiana
Nuclear power plants in Louisiana
Nuclear power stations using pressurized water reactors
Entergy
1985 establishments in Louisiana